Now is the third studio album by English rock musician Paul Rodgers, of Free and Bad Company fame. Released on 17 June 1997, Now is Paul Rodgers' second solo work of original material, following 1983's Cut Loose. Now the album is more known as a part of 2-CD set, Now & Live including a disc of the 1995 live performance at which Rodgers performed many Free and Bad Company favourites.

Track listing
All tracks written by Paul Rodgers, except where noted.

 "Soul of Love" – 4:51
 "Overloaded" – 3:16
 "Heart of Fire" – 4:13 
 "Saving Grace " (Rodgers, Neal Schon, Geoff Whitehorn) – 4:51
 "All I Want Is You"  – 5:33
 "Chasing Shadows" – 4:43
 "Love Is All I Need" – 5:57
 "Nights Like This" – 5:19
 "Shadow of the Sun" – 5:23
 "I Lost It All" – 5:53
 "Holding Back the Storm" (Rodgers, Andrea Rodriguez)– 4:54

Japanese release [VICP-5815] has a bonus track "Ride My Love".

Personnel
Paul Rodgers - vocals, 12-string guitar, rhythm guitar, piano on "Love Is All I Need"
Geoff Whitehorn - lead guitar, backing vocals
Jaz Lochrie - bass, backing vocals
Jim Copley - drums
with:
Clive Brown and the Shekinah Singers - choir on "Love Is All I Need"
Jennifer Phillips, Paul Boldeau - vocals on "Love Is All I Need"
Dan Priest - tambourine on "Love Is All I Need"

Charts

Singles

Paul Rodgers albums
1997 albums
Albums produced by Eddie Kramer